Oggelshausen is a municipality in the district of Biberach in Baden-Württemberg in Germany.

Mayors 
1984–2005: Alois Dangel
2005–2021: Ralf Kriz
2021–    : Michael Kara

References

Biberach (district)